Sphallambyx superbum is a species of beetle in the family Cerambycidae. It was described by Per Olof Christopher Aurivillius in 1910. It is known from Colombia.

References

Cerambycini
Beetles described in 1910